Campion School is a leading English-language private international school in Athens, Greece, which provides an adapted British educational curriculum to approximately 650 children of foreign residents, the Greek diaspora and local Greeks, from Nursery through to Year 13 (ages three to eighteen). The pupils include children coming from more than 40 different countries.

History
Campion School was founded in 1970 in Athens, Greece, by American banker and philhellene Thomas Shortell, his wife Betsy Shortell, and American businessman, and later diplomat, Burke O'Connor as an independent, non-profit Anglo-American school governed by a board of trustees.

The academic programme is based on the National Curriculum (England and Wales) adapted to make full use of the location and culture of Greece. Courses lead to IGCSE and the International Baccalaureate Diploma (IB). Class sizes are generally small, and children's progress is carefully monitored by a system of class teachers, advisers and year tutors. The school's IGCSE and IB results are consistently well above the UK and IB averages and the school has had six students complete the IB Diploma with a score of 45, the highest grade possible. Students aim for university education in the United Kingdom, various countries within the EU, the USA and Canada. The school provides a dedicated Universities Counsellor who works together with both pupils and parents regarding achieving university entrance goals. The counsellor also organizes regular visitations from university representatives from around the world.

The performing arts are well represented both inside and outside the curriculum, and dramatic performances take place in each school at least once per term. Choral and instrumental groups meet on a regular basis, and individual tuition is provided for a variety of musical instruments. There is a wide range of competitive sports on offer and students are encouraged to take part. Football (soccer), volleyball and basketball teams regularly play against opponents from Greece and abroad. Other activities include tennis, athletics, cross-country running, trampolining and modern dance.

The School is now located in purpose-built premises in the suburb of Pallini, 16km east of the city centre, where a full range of academic, sporting and artistic facilities has been constructed. A sports facility which includes a professional soccer pitch, running track and changing pavilion was inaugurated in May 2012. Classrooms are equipped with interactive whiteboards and Wi-Fi. The school organises a bus service covering many suburbs in the greater Athens area. Each bus has an adult supervisor in addition to the driver.

Campion is an accredited member of COBIS (Council of British International Schools). and ECIS (European Council of International Schools); in the most recent ISI inspection of the campus in 2014, Campion School scored "Excellent in all categories".

Pupils
Each student is organised into one of the houses, which are named after legendary Greek heroes Alexander, Pericles, Theseus and Heracles. Merits and house points are given to students when exceptional effort is made in order to encourage students and build self-confidence. Pupils are required to wear a uniform up to and including Year 11; students in Years 12 and 13 must adhere to a dress code.

The Campion school uniform has, since its introduction, always consisted of a combination of blue, white, and red.  Boys wear navy blue trousers, a white polo shirt and a navy jumper, while girls wear navy blue trousers or a skirt, a white blouse and a red (Junior School) or navy blue (Senior School) jumper.

The pupils are divided into Nursery, Reception, Junior (years one through six) and Senior (years seven through thirteen) divisions which, while previously housed at different locations, are now combined on the same premises but in separate buildings.

School activities and curriculum 
Campion pupils enjoy a wide variety of extra-curricular activities, including weekly clubs. Students may choose musical instrument lessons including piano, violin, cello, guitar, etc. In addition, pupils are provided with a variety of sports clubs. These include football, softball, tennis (the school has four full-sized multi-use tennis courts), basketball, volleyball, track and field amongst others. There is a debate club in which students prepare motions and debate every week. Every year the debate team participates in various different tournaments across Greece, including the Panhellenic Forensics tournament.

Campion School holds its MUN (Model United Nations), the CSMUN, annually in October. 

Campion school has a parents' group, the PRC, PRC (Parents Recreation Club), a group of parents and guardians which meet to discuss and arrange charity sales, fundraisers, Hallowe'en Bonfire, the school's Christmas Bazaar and International Day.  

Campion school holds performances such as the Christmas concert (organised by the Music Department), Junior and Senior summer concerts, the staff concert,  musicals (arranged by the Drama and Music departments), and talks during assemblies from professionals outside the school.  

Campion School is known for its wide range of choices for trips around Greece and Europe. Year group trips and research trips are organised to noted sites of interest around the country such as Delphi, Messolonghi, Chalkida, Santorini and Milos. The Modern Languages Department also holds trips within Europe to Spain and France.  

Campion School's curricula are extremely well organised and thorough, and are taught by well qualified staff. During years 10 and 11, students prepare for IGCSE exams which take place at the end of Year 11. All students then pursue the IB Diploma Programme IB (International Baccalaureate) during years 12 and 13. In the most recent results of 2022, students in Campion achieved exceptional IB results, with the average mark of 38 (out of 45), 6 marks higher than the global average and higher than any other international school in Greece. The pass rate was 100%. The former Headmaster of Campion, Mr Stephen Atherton, received MBE (Member of the order of the British Empire) in 2022.

Staff 
The majority of the staff are graduates of UK universities and all members of staff are dedicated specialists in their subject area. The current Headmaster is Michael Henderson. The IB coordinator is Kate Varey and the Head of Juniors is Judi Korakaki.

Leading Staff and Head of Depts 

 Mr Calafatis - Business Director
 Ms M Balaskas - Admissions Officer
 Mrs E Siani - Universities Counsellor
 Ms Baker - Communications and Marketing officer
 Mr Politsopoulous - IT and Facilities manager
 Ms Rylander - Systems & Data manager
 Miss Papadimitriou - Head of English
 Mr Dimakos - Head of Maths
 Ms Varey - Head of History
 Ms Bakalis - Head of Classics
 Miss Meidana - Head of Greek
 Mrs Tambaki - Head of Science
 Ms Helsby - Head of Music
 Mr Tilley - Head of Geography
 Mr Pasios - Head of Physical Education
 Mr Psarrou - Head of Social Sciences
 Mr Dres - Head of Art
 Ms Rogakou - Head of Drama
 Ms Marti - Head of Modern Languages

Former Headmasters

1970-1973 Richard Forbes, MA (Cantab)

1973-1980 Jack Meyer (educator and cricketer), the founder of Millfield in England and St Lawrence College, Athens.

1980-1983 Thomas Howarth.

1983-1988 Anthony F Eggleston

1988-1990  C. Douglas Juckes

1990-1991 Dennis Mackinnon

1991-2020 Stephen W Atherton (educator and pianist)

2020-2021 Duncan Rose
2021-Present, Mike Henderson (Former Head of Seniors)

Notable alumni
Demetres Karavellas, 1985 - Director of WWF, Greece
Mario Frangoulis, 1985 - Tenor
Sunita Shroff, actress and TV presenter
Jonathan Rendall Award Winning Writer
Marilena Panayotopoulos Dramaturg, Theatre Professional and Public Persona
Toni Garrn - Model
Thomas Jansen - Actor for Nickelodeon, Hunter Street
Melia Kreiling - Actor for The Borgias, Salvation, Filthy Rich, Mammals
Konnie Metaxa, actress and singer

References

External links
Official website 
Profile at COBIS 

 Private schools in Greece
Educational institutions established in 1970
International Baccalaureate schools in Greece
1970 establishments in Greece
Education in Athens